Georgi Nedyalkov (born 2 November 1989 in Elin Pelin) is a Bulgarian footballer currently playing for Vitosha Bistritsa as a midfielder.

Career

Levski Sofia
Nedyalkov comes directly from Levski Sofia's youth academy. Anyway, after the creation of the second team of Levski, he became a part of the newly formed PFC Levski Sofia B. During the first season of the 'B' league, Levski became a champion.

Nedyalkov made his debut for Levski's senior team on 13 June 2009 in a match against Pirin Blagoevgrad. The result of the match was 1–1 draw. The goal for Levski was scored by Nedyalkov in 76th minute.

Sportist Svoge
On 3 July 2009 it was announced that Nedyalkov would be playing on loan for FC Sportist Svoge during the 2009/2010 season.

References

External links
 Nedyalkov at Levski's site
 

1989 births
Living people
Bulgarian footballers
PFC Levski Sofia players
FC Sportist Svoge players
PFC Kom-Minyor players
OFC Sliven 2000 players
First Professional Football League (Bulgaria) players
Association football midfielders